Patrick Mimran (born 1956 in Paris, France) is a contemporary French multimedia artist, composer, and the former CEO of Lamborghini. He is most widely known for Lamborghini's turn-around in the early 1980s and his art exhibit, "The Billboard Project".

Biography

Business

Lamborghini: 1978-1987 
Before becoming an artist, Patrick Mimran was the owner and CEO of Lamborghini. In 1981, at the age of 24, Mimran and his brother, Jean Claude, purchased the company's failing assets for US$3 million. The brothers had purchased the company out of receivership by 1984 and began investing heavily in the company's expansion, developing a comprehensive restructuring program. Under the Mimrans' management, Lamborghini's model line was expanded from the Countach to include the Jalpa sports car and the LM002 off-road vehicle. Patrick served as CEO until 1987 when he sold the company to Chrysler.

Art

Multimedia artist: 1990-present 
After years as a successful businessman, Mimran turned to art. Mimran's artwork has ranged through media including painting, photography, video art, sculpture, and installations. Mimran's work has been exhibited in museums including the Leonardo da Vinci Museum for Science and Technology, Palazzo Venezia and Kunstpalais Erlangen, as well as festivals including the Venice Architecture Biennale, Art Cologne, Art Paris and Art Karlsruhe.

Musical composition 
He also works in electronic music, composing the score for Maurice Béjart’s ballet Kurozuka[3] (performed at the Bunkan Kalkan Theatre, Tokyo)[4] and collaborating with Peter Greenaway. Mimran composed scores for Greenaway projects including the multidisciplinary film and art installation "Stairs 1 Geneva", the 1996 film, The Pillow Book, the 1996 public art event "La Cosmologia di Piazza del Popolo Roma", and the art installation, "In the Dark", which was featured in the 1996 exhibition, "Spellbound: Art and Film" at the Hayward Gallery of London. In addition to musical scores, Mimran has released four albums. Novels For The Moons (1981), his first album, was heavily influenced by German electronic pioneers and released on the imprint Lamborghini Records. He subsequently released Back to Earth (1983), Honni Soit – Qui Mal Y Pense (1987) with vocalist James Bowman, and Service Entrance (2017), a collection of soft piano music.

Sculpture 
Mimran's "Jet Set Giraffe" sculpture, standing at 7.5 meters, is considered the tallest giraffe sculpture in the world. It was installed in the Monte Carlo's Grand Casino Garden from 2009 to 2013, when it was moved to its permanent home at the Colchester Zoo in Essex, England. The giraffe, made of glass fiber and steel, appears to be solid metallic silver but transforms into a silhouette lit by 214 colorful lights at night.

The Billboard Project: 2000-2012 
Patrick Mimran is best known in the United States for his Billboard Project, a comprehensive series of billboards which he initiated in 2000 in London and later expanded to New York, Miami, Venice, and Tokyo. For the project, Mimran used advertisement billboards as a platform for short aphorisms that provided commentary about art and the relationships between artists, critics, curators and art dealers. The billboards attracted a fan base.

Wearable art 
In 2015, Mimran turned 25 of his paintings into wearable art by developing the cashmere scarf line, Allezzou Fashion.

Digital art 
Mimran recently developed the Aphos App, a digital rendition of his "Billboard Project" which allows users anywhere in the world to create their own boards with quotes, aphorisms, and comments about art, politics, news, fashion, music, or any subject related to their daily lives and interests.

Exhibits 
 2013
 L'art prend la ville !, DeFacto Gallery, La defense, Paris, France 
 Billboard Project, Istituto degli Innocenti, Mudi, Piazza SS Annunziata 12, Florence, Italy 
 GHOSTS, Recent paintings, Palazzo Malipiero, Ramo Malipiero, Venice, Italy 
 IN THE MIROR OF REALITY, La galleria, Venice, Italy
 2012
 iRonic, Bietigheim-Bissingen 
 Trash Can Project, Campo san manuele, Venice, Italy 
 After, New Photographs, Palazzo Malipiero, Venice, Italy
 2011
 Ironic. Die feinsinnige Ironie der Kunst, Kunstpalais 
 Patrick Mimran billboard, Palais Stutterheim, Erlangen, Germany 
 Patrick Mimran, Group Show, Galerie Dorothea van der Koelen 
 Art in movimento, La Galeria Venezia 
 After, New Photographs, Palazzo Malipiero, Venice, Italy 
 Patrick Mimran, Photographs, Art Paris 2011 
 Paul Ardenne, Realite revisitee, Analix Forever 
 Patrick Mimran, Billboard Project, Galerie Dorothea van der Koelen, Art Cologne 
 Patrick Mimran, Billboard Project, Galerie Dorothea van der Koelen, Art Karlsruhe
 2010
 Nuit Blanche, Billboard project, Toronto, Canada 
 La Galleria, Photos of my billboard project, Dorothea van der Koelen, Venice, Italy
 2009
 Trash Can Project, Campo san manuele, Venice, Italy, Museo Nazionale Scienza e Tecnologia Leonardo da Vinci
 Patrick Mimran, Billboard project, Milan, Italy
 Patrick Mimran, Billboard project, Galerie Dorothea Van der koelen, Italy
 Les Photaumnales, Musee departemental de la haute-garonne, Beauvais oise France 
 Patrick Mimran, car park in New York
 2008
 11th Mostra internazionale di architecttura La biennale di Venezia, Billboards in the city, Venice, Italy 
 Patrick Mimran Billboard Project, Museo Nazionale Scienza e Tecnologia Leonardo da Vinci, Milan, Italy 
 Prelevements Urbains, Le mois de la photo à Paris, Passage de Retz, Paris, France 
 Patrick Mimran “Temple Steps” recent photographs, Bay 100, Miami, USA
 2007
 Billboard project, 24th 25th 26th street, 31, Chelsea, New York, USA 
 Recent Paintings Muramatsu Gallery, Tokyo, Japan Billboard Project Tokyo, Japan 
 New York Parkings, Palazzo Malipiero, Venice, Italy 
 Trash Can Project, Campo san manuele, Venice, Italy 
 Lyon Billboard Project, Lyon, France 
 Brahmatic A video Installation, National Museum Leonardo da vinci, Milan, Italy 
 Recent paintings , video and photographs, Palazzo Venezia, Rome, Italy 
 Vertigo revisited a Video Installaton, Kent Gallery, Miami, USA Biennale de Florence, Florence, Italy
 2006
 Installation video paintings and photographs 
 Brahmatic, Solo show, Moscow world fine art fair, Moscow, Russia 
 Billboard project, 20 billboards in Moscow, Moscow, Russia 
 Billboard project, 24th 25th 26th street, Chelsea, New York, USA 
 Billboard project, Bridge of the Academia, Venice, Italy 
 Billboard project, Piazza del Popolo, Roma, Italy 
 Billboard project, Museo d’arte moderna, Bologna, Italy
 2005
 Billboard project, Bridge of the Academia, Venice, Italy 
 Billboard project 24th 25th 26th street, Chelsea, New York, USA
 2004
 Brahmâtic, Fondazione Querini Stampalia, Venice, Italy 
 Altered states, The Milk Studio, New York, USA 
 Billboard project, Bridge of the Academia, Venice, Italy 
 Billboard project, 24th 25th 26th street, Chelsea, New York, USA 
 L’oeuf” 2nd international biennale of sculpture of Monte-Carlo, Montecarlo, Monaco
 2003
 The Tower of Babel, Eggenberg Palace, Graz, Austria 
 Babel.TV" Group exhibition displaying, Graz, Austria 
 Discomatic, Espace Bellevue, Biarritz, France 
 Discomatic, Museo Valenciano de la Ilustracion y la Modernidad, Valencia, Spain 
 Billboard project Museo di Ca' Pesaro, Venice, Italy 
 Billboard project, 24th 25th 26th street, Chelsea, New York, USA 
 Paintings, Museo Nacional De Artes Visuales, Parque Rodó, Montevideo, Uruguay 
 Vertigo, Circulo de Bellas Artes Alcala 42, Madrid, Spain
 2002
 Vertigo, The Game in 20th Century Art, Palacio de Montemuzo, Zaragoza Spain 
 Billboard project, 24th 25th 26th street, Chelsea, New York, USA 
 Jet Set Giraffe, The Parade of Animals Second edition of the International Sculpture, Festival of Monte-Carlo Jardins du Casino, Monte Carlo, Monaco 
 Vertigo, Games in the Art of the 20th century, Espace Bellevue, Biarritz, France
 2001
 Babel.TV, Marlborough Chelsea, New York, USA 
 Babel.TV, Orangerie de Bagatelle, Paris, France 
 Billboard Project, West 24th and West 26th Street between 10th and 11th Avenues, Chelsea, New York, USA
 2000
 Paintings for billboard,Cromwell Road, London, Great Britain 
 First Baby, Walking Man, From Rodin to Mimran, Jardin du Palais Royal, Paris, France 
 Walking Man, From Rodin to Mimran, Lange Voorhoot, The Hague, The Netherlands
 1999
 Recent Paintings, Marlborough Gallery, New York, USA 
 The rhythm of time, The Almodin, Valencia, Spain
 1996
 Paintings, Marlborough Gallery New York, NY
 1971
 Sweet Murder, Galerie Laudann, Lausanne, Switzerland 
 Sweet Murder, Maison des jeunes et de la culture, Thonon les bains, France

Bibliography
 Paul Ardenne, Patrick Mimran, partage des correspondances, Editions du Regard, Paris, 2001.
 Paul Ardenne, Babel/TV, Editions du Regard, 2001.
 Urban Samples/Prélèvements urbains (photographies), Editions Monografik, 2008.
 Beate Reifenscheid and Dorothea van der Koelen; Arte in Movimento – Kunst in Bewegung, Dokumente unserer Zeit XXXIV; Chorus-Verlag; Mainz 2011;

References

External links
  
 Patrick Mimran sur actuphoto.com 

1956 births
Living people
French artists
French businesspeople
Lamborghini people